Gand Ab (also Romanized as Gand Āb, Ganjāb, Ganāv, Ganāu, and Gandāb) is a village in Oshtorinan Rural District, Oshtorinan District, Borujerd County, Lorestan Province, Iran. At the 2006 census, its population was 25, in 7 families.

References 

Towns and villages in Borujerd County